The Milwaukee District West Line (MD-W) is a Metra commuter rail line in Chicago, Illinois, and its western suburbs. Metra does not refer to any of its lines by a particular color, but the timetable accents for the Milwaukee District West line are dark "Arrow Yellow," honoring the Milwaukee Road's Arrow passenger train. Trains are dispatched from Canadian Pacific's American headquarters in Minneapolis.

The line runs from Chicago Union Station in downtown Chicago through the western suburbs to Elgin, Illinois. As of December 12, 2022, the public timetable shows 52 trains (26 in each direction) operating on weekdays. Three outbound trains terminate at Franklin Park, one at National Street, and the remainder terminate at Big Timber Road.

On weekends, Metra operates 12 roundtrips on Saturdays and nine on Sundays and holidays, all running from Union Station to Elgin. There is no weekend or holiday service to Big Timber Road.

The line runs on the Canadian Pacific Railway Elgin Subdivision (Ex-Milwaukee Road line to Omaha). In 1982, this line was sold to the newly created Northeast Illinois Regional Commuter Rail Corporation which ran commuter trains for the Milwaukee Road while the latter underwent reorganization. The Milwaukee Road retained ownership of the line until 1986. Metra formally purchased the Milwaukee District lines from the Soo Line Railroad (which took the bankrupt Milwaukee Road under its wing in 1985) in 1987. The Soo Line Railroad then ran freight trains on the line via trackage rights before its absorption into the CP in 1990.

Metra has included the possibility of extending the Milwaukee District West Line along one of two routes in their Cost Benefit Analysis report. If this were to happen, the line could continue west via Canadian Pacific trackage to Hampshire, with an additional stop in Pingree Grove. Alternatively, the line could switch to the Union Pacific Railroad's Belvidere line and travel northwest from Big Timber Road to Marengo, with additional stops in Gilberts, Huntley, and Union.

Ridership
Between 2014 and 2019, annual ridership declined 15% from 6,946,268 to 5,904,808. Due to the COVID-19 pandemic, ridership dropped to 1,480,973 passengers in 2020.

Rolling stock
The MD-W line's locomotive fleet consists of mainly MPI MP36PH-3C diesel-electric locomotives, with some EMD F40PH locomotives. The line also operates ex-GO Transit EMD F59PH locomotives. The fleet is pooled with the fleets for the North Central Service and the Milwaukee District North Line. As of 2016, three of these locomotives are in operation.

Coaches, or passenger railcars, consist mostly of Nippon Sharyo railcars built in the early 2000s. Cab cars are Nippon Sharyo built. Budd-built railcars also operate on the line, but the cab cars built by Budd have not been in use since the delivery of the newer railcars.

Stations

References

External links 

 Metra Milwaukee District/West service schedule

Metra lines
Chicago, Milwaukee, St. Paul and Pacific Railroad
Elgin, Illinois